Snedinge is a former manor house and estate located in Slagelse Municipality, Denmark. It has been a farm under Holsteinsborg since 1708. A three-winged complex of farm buildings from circa 1567-1663 have been listed on the Danish registry of protected buildings and places. The main building is from the 1900s but the cellar and foundations date from 1615. It is not listed. , a small museum dedicated to the history of agriculture, fishing and crafts in the area, is located in one of the former cow stables (west wing).

History
 
Snedinge Manor was established in around 1370 from land that previously belonged to a village of the same name. Both the manor and the village belonged to the Fief of Bråde, which again belonged to the Bishops of Roskilde. In the 15th and 16th centuries, Snedinge was owned by members of the noble Grubbe and Daa families. Herluf Trolle Daa placed the village of Snedinge's remaining land under the manor and later sold the estate to his relative Alexander Rabe von Papenheim.

 
In 1731, Papenheim was succeeded as owner of the estate by his widow Regitze Grubbe. Their heirs sold Snedinge to Niels Trolle in 1767. He was already the owner of Trolholm. His son, Herluf Trolle, inherited the estate in 1667. In 1707, he sold it to his brother, Ulrik Adolph Holstein. In 1708, he established the Countship of Holsteinsborg from Snedinge and the farms Fyrendal and Trolholm.

Architecture
The two-winged main building is built in red brick. The walls are partly dressed.

The three-winged complex of farm buildings is built in red brick with grow-stepped gables. Gates, door and windows are generally painted red. Some of the windows have round-arched iron frames. The roofs were originally thatched but are now clad with metal plating. Kostalden og laden med de to smallere sidebygninger (1663) samt den lange østlænge (antagelig 1567 og ca. 1660). Fredet 1918. Udvidet 1964.

The north wing is a barn from 1773. Two slightly lower and narrower extensions project from each end of the gables. There is a large gate in the middle of the south wing of the courtyard. The walls feature a series of wall anchors; those in the west gable are shaped as the year "1663". A second gate is located in the western gable. The east wing is from 1567 and partly attached to the north wing. It was built as combined horse stables, carriage house and granary loft. The courtyard (west) side of the building is red-washed while the other sides stand in undressed brick. It now contains a small residence at each gable. The free-standing west wing was built as cow stables. The building is from 1663 but the short side wings that project from the west side of the building are newer extensions.

The three-winged complex of farm buildings have been listed on the Danish registry of protected buildings and places in 1918 and 1964.

Today
Snedinge is today owned by Ulrich Holstein-Holsteinborg and operated as a farm under Holsteinsborg.

List of owners
 (1370) Bishops of Roskilde 
 (1400) Jacobus Martini de Snøtinge 
 (1460) Olaf Grubbe 
 (1481) Jens Mikkelsen 
 (1500) Niels Grubbe 
 (1511- ) Karen Daa, née Grubbe
 ( -1538) Erik Daa 
 (1538-1597) Jørgen Daa 
 (1597- ) Herluf Trolle Daa 
 ( -1631) Alexander Rabe von Papenheim 
 (1631-1650) Regitze Papenheim, née Grubbe
 (1650-1656) Heirs of Regitze Grubbe 
 (1656-1667) Niels Trolle 
 (1667-1707) Herluf Trolle 
 (1707-1737) Ulrich Adolph Holstein-Holsteinborg 
 (1737-1749) Frederik Conrad Holstein-Holsteinborg 
 (1749-1759) Christoph Conrad Holstein-Holsteinborg 
 (1759-1760) Cay Joachim Detlev Holstein-Holsteinborg 
 (1760-1796) Heinrich Holstein-Holsteinborg 
 (1796-1836) Frederik Adolph Holstein-Holsteinborg 
 (1836-1892) Ludvig Henrik Carl Herman Holstein-Holsteinborg 
 (1892-1922) Frederik Conrad Christian Christoffer, born (?) Holstein-Holsteinborg 
 (1922-1960) Erik Frederik Adolph Joachim Holstein-Holsteinborg 
 (1960- ) Ib Holstein-Holsteinborg 
 (1981- ) Ulrich Holstein-Holsteinborg

References

External links

listed buildings and structures in Slagelse Municipality
Manor houses in Slagelse Municipality
Buildings and structures associated with the Daa family
Buildings and structures in Denmark associated with the Trolle family
Buildings and structures associated with the Holstein family